Liechtenstein competed at the 1988 Summer Paralympics in Seoul, South Korea. 2 competitors from Liechtenstein won no medals and so did not place in the medal table. Athlete Iris Schaelder competed in the Women's Long Jump B1, having previously competed in the same event in 1984. Table Tennis player Peter Frommelt competed in the Men's Singles TT5 and reached the quarter-final where he lost to the silver medallist Thomas Schmitt (West Germany).

See also 
 Liechtenstein at the Paralympics
 Liechtenstein at the 1988 Summer Olympics

References 

Liechtenstein at the Paralympics
Nations at the 1988 Summer Paralympics